Ronan Moore is a politician and school teacher, and the author of a number of books with a focus on quirks of Irish culture.

Life
Moore was born in, and his family comes from, Trim, County Meath. As of 2015, he lives with his wife Frances Haworth, and three children. 

He received a degree in English and History from NUI Galway followed by a Masters in Sustainable Development from Dublin Institute of Technology.

Career
He has worked with Trócaire in Nigeria. As of 2020, he works as a secondary school English and history teacher at St Patrick's Classical School.

Writing
In 2015 Moore published Irishology, which discusses the strange quirks of Irish culture. This would become the first of a trilogy of similar books when in 2016 it would be followed by Irishography which discussed parts of Ireland's geography. 2020 Moore would publish "Young Fionn", a retelling of the Boyhood Deeds of Fionn aimed at a young audience, with the help of the publisher Gill Books and illustrator Alexandra Colombo.

Politics 
In the 2019 Meath County Council election, Moore won a seat for the Social Democrats in the Trim local area. In 2020 he was  elected as Cathaoirleach in the Trim District. In the 2020 Irish general election he stood as in the Meath West constituency, but was not elected.

Moore, along with other councilors, opposed a motion to remove the books To Kill a Mockingbird and Of Mice and Men from the school curriculum due to racist language. He defended the books by saying they were important in teaching students about the history of racism and racial injustice.

Bibliography 
Irishology (2015)
Irishography (2016)
Irishisms (2017)
Young Fionn: Small kid, Big Legend (2020)
Fionn and the Fianna (2021)

References 

Living people
Alumni of the University of Galway
Alumni of Dublin Institute of Technology
Social Democrats (Ireland) politicians
Irish writers
Year of birth missing (living people)